Larry Turner (born December 29, 1982) is the high school coach of the Weber School Rams and former American professional basketball player.

Playing career
He played college basketball at Tennessee State. He is a 6'11" center and was formerly signed by the Los Angeles Lakers as a free agent.

From mid- to late 2010, he was playing with BC Odessa in the Ukrainian Basketball Super League.

On 30 October 2015, he moved to Cypriot club APOEL and helped his team to win the Cypriot Cup.

Coaching career
Larry Turner retired from playing after the 2015-2016 season and began coaching at The Weber School for the 2016-2017 basketball season.

Personal life
Larry Turner runs a basketball camp called LarryTurnerSports during the summer.

References

External links
 Draftexpress.com Profile

1982 births
Living people
American expatriate basketball people in Canada
American expatriate basketball people in Cyprus
American expatriate basketball people in Greece
American expatriate basketball people in Japan
American expatriate basketball people in Romania
American expatriate basketball people in Spain
American expatriate basketball people in Ukraine
American expatriate basketball people in Venezuela
American men's basketball players
APOEL B.C. players
Apollon Patras B.C. players
Basketball players from Georgia (U.S. state)
BC Odesa players
Capitanes de Arecibo players
Centers (basketball)
CS Energia Rovinari players
Fort Wayne Mad Ants players
Gaiteros del Zulia players
Koroivos B.C. players
Oklahoma Sooners men's basketball players
Panelefsiniakos B.C. players
Tennessee State Tigers basketball players
Toyama Grouses players